Juliana Sakae is a Brazilian journalist and filmmaker whose work focuses on social issue documentaries, human rights and children. Her first film, Bleu et Rouge, tells the story of Haiti through the eyes of seven Haitian teenagers, and was filmed the summer before the 2010 Haiti earthquake. Bleu et Rouge screened in several festivals in Brazil and it also was used to raise funds for Haitian earthquake victims.

Sakae's documentary, Antigirl, about a street artist won the Best Short Doc at the Los Angeles Film and Script Festival and was selected at the Female Eye Film Festival in Toronto.

Filmography 
 The Secret of Sound Design (Producer, 2016)
 Love Addiction (Producer, 2016)
 Lola Divas (Producer, 2015)
 Living in Noisy Life (Producer, 2015)
 Learning to Share (Editor, 2015)
 Antigirl (Director, 2014)
 Love Bid (Producer, 2014)
 Gev (Director, 2014)
 Aftermath (Director, 2013)
 Nino (Director, 2013)
 Paredes Pentads (Producer, 2010 / Brazil)
 Bleu et Rouge (Director, 2010)

Honors and awards

 Los Angeles Film and Script Festival: Best Short Documentary: "Antigirl"
 RBS Awards 2011: Best Creative Project: "Laguna's Conquest told on Twitter"
 RBS Awards 2011: Innovative Journalist
 Official Selection 2015 Female Eye Film Festival
 Official Selection 2011 Mostra Internacional Etnografica
 Official Selection 2011 Catavideo
 Official Selection 2010 Cinesul
 Official Selection 2010 Cinedocumenta

References

External links
 

Brazilian film directors
Brazilian journalists
Brazilian women film directors
Brazilian women writers
Living people
Year of birth missing (living people)